Stephen Murray was a Scottish football player, who played for Stenhousemuir and Dumbarton during the 1930s.

References 

Scottish footballers
Dumbarton F.C. players
Scottish Football League players
Stenhousemuir F.C. players
Kirkintilloch Rob Roy F.C. players
1913 births
Date of birth missing
Year of death missing
Association footballers not categorized by position